Lephephe, also known as Lehepe or Lephepe, is a village in Kweneng District of Botswana. The population of Lephephe was 742 in 2001 census.

References

Kweneng District
Villages in Botswana